White terns are species of terns that belong to the genus Gygis. The best known (and formerly only) species in the genus is the common white tern. The little white tern (Gygis microrhyncha), previously considered a subspecies of the white tern (Gygis alba microrhyncha), is now recognised as a separate species.

References

Bird genera
 
Taxa named by Johann Georg Wagler